The Cessna 401 and 402 are a series of 6 to 10 seat, light twin-piston engine aircraft. This line was manufactured by Cessna from 1966 to 1985 under the name Utiliner and Businessliner. All seats are easily removable so that the aircraft can be used in an all-cargo configuration. Neither the Cessna 401 nor the 402 were pressurized, nor were they particularly fast for the installed power. Instead, Cessna intended them to be inexpensive to purchase and operate.

Design

The Cessna 401 and 402 were developed to be non-pressurized twin engine piston aircraft.  Their goal was to be a workhorse, useful to  cargo and small commuter airlines among other users.

The Cessna 401 and 402 were developments of the Cessna 411.  One goal for the Cessna 401/402 was to improve upon the very bad single engine handling of the Cessna 411.  Another goal was to avoid using the somewhat expensive and maintenance prone geared engines of the Cessna 411.

Cessna 401s and 402s are powered by  turbocharged Continental engines with three-bladed, constant speed, fully feathering propellers. On later models cruise power was limited to 75% to reduce cabin noise. Some aircraft have a propeller synchrophaser to reduce cabin noise and vibration.

Development
The FAA granted certification to the Cessna 401 in October 1968 and the 402 in January 1969.
The original Cessna 402 was introduced in 1967.  A version without the large cargo door called the Cessna 401 was produced at the same time.
In 1969, the 402's nose was stretched for added baggage space.  This model was renamed the 402A.  The 401 kept the original nose.
In 1970, various minor changes were made. This model was called the 402B.
By 1971, sales of the 401 had slowed to only 21 planes, so the model was discontinued.

Between 1971 and 1977, many changes were made to the airframe, including an optional engine fire extinguisher (1971), simpler exhaust system (1972), enlarged passenger windows (1973), equipment for flight into known icing conditions (1975), and an optional flushing toilet (1977).

In 1976, the very similar Cessna 421 was produced with a new wing, no tip tanks, and a simpler fuel system. The Cessna 414 was given a clean wing in 1978.

In 1979, the 402s received a new wing, with a  greater span. The landing gear was replaced, using the simpler system from the Cessna 414. Even with the weight increase, single-engine performance improved and the stall speed decreased by a couple of knots. After this change, the plane was named the Cessna 402C.

Production stopped after the 1985 model year.

Modifications
In 1969, American Jet Industries began work on a turboprop-powered conversion of the Cessna 402, named the Turbo Star 402, using Allison 250-B17 engines. The prototype flew on 10 June 1970. Further modifications providing increased fuel capacity, higher gross weight, and lower minimum control speed were carried out in 1974 and the modification was re-certified. Scenic Airlines of Las Vegas purchased rights to the design in 1977.

Hendrik Venter of DMI engineering created the Falcon 402: a converted Cessna 402 fitted with a single Walter M601D turboprop in the nose and replacing the two piston engines in the wings with new fuel tanks. The nose was lengthened in order to correct the centre of gravity. It has an increased payload and top speed and can use shorter runways

Variants

This family of aircraft was built in several versions:

Six to eight seat interior, intended for corporate transport. Produced 1966–1972. The replacement for the 401 in the corporate transport role was the 402 Businessliner variant. Certified 20 September 1966.
401A
A 401 with minor changes. Certified 29 October 1968.

A 401A with minor changes, later replaced by the 402B. Certified 12 November 1969.
402
A 401 with either a utility (for freight) or nine-seat commuter use. Certified 20 September 1966.
402A
A 402 with a baggage compartment in lengthened nose and an optional crew entry door. Certified 3 January 1969.
402B Utiliner/Businessliner
402A with minor changes, from 1972 had increased cabin volume and five windows each side. Certified 12 November 1969.
Utiliner version has a ten-seat interior intended for commuter airline operations.
Businessliner version has a six to eight-seat interior with executive seating intended for corporate transport.

402B with Continental TSIO-520-VB 325 hp engines, increased takeoff weight, longer wingspan without main tip tanks and hydraulic instead of electric landing gear. Certified 25 September 1978.

Operators

Civilian
The Cessna 402 has proven to be very dependable over the years, which, along with its range and passenger capacity, has made it a popular choice for many small regional airlines worldwide. The aircraft are generally flown on short, thin routes to hubs where passengers can connect to higher density routes.

The largest operator of the type is Cape Air, which as of June 2019 has a fleet of 88 Cessna 402s operating in the Caribbean, Micronesia and United States.

Military

Accident

American R&B singer Aaliyah died along with eight others, including the pilot, two hairstylists, a makeup artist, a bodyguard, and three record label professionals, when a Cessna 402B registered N8097W, crashed shortly after takeoff on August 25, 2001, around 6:50p.m. local time, in Marsh Harbour, Abaco Islands, The Bahamas. Investigators discovered that the pilot, Luis Morales III, was unlicensed at the time of the crash and had traces of cocaine and alcohol in his system. Aaliyah's family later filed a wrongful death lawsuit against Blackhawk International Airways, which was settled out of court.

Specifications (402C Businessliner)

See also

References

Notes

Bibliography

External links

 

402
1960s United States civil utility aircraft
Low-wing aircraft
Aircraft first flown in 1965
Twin piston-engined tractor aircraft